Reinke is a surname. Notable people with the surname include:

 Andreas Reinke (born 1969), German footballer
 Andreas Reinke (rower) (born 1962), German rower
 Ernst Reinke (1891–1943), German politician
 Friedrich Berthold Reinke (1862–1919), German anatomist
 George Reinke (1914–2009), American politician
 Johannes Reinke (1849–1931), German botanist and philosopher
 Judy Rising Reinke, American diplomat
 Mitch Reinke (born 1996), American ice hockey defenseman
 Ramona Reinke, German swimmer
 Russell Reinke (1921–2004), Canadian businessman and politician
 Ruth Reinke Whitney (1928–1999), American magazine editor
 Steve Reinke (born 1963), Canadian video artist and filmmaker

Surnames from given names